The Asia/Oceania Zone was one of three zones of regional competition in the 2017 Fed Cup.

Group I 
 Venue: Daulet National Tennis Centre, Astana, Kazakhstan (indoor hard)
 Date: 8–11 February

The seven teams were divided into two pools of three and four teams. The two pool winners took part in a play-off to determine the nation advancing to the World Group II play-offs. The nations finishing last in their pools took part in a relegation play-off, with the losing nation being relegated to Group II for 2018.

Seeding: The seeding was based on the Fed Cup Rankings of 14 November 2016 (shown in parentheses below).

Pools

Play-offs

Final placements 

 was promoted to the 2017 Fed Cup World Group II play-offs.
 was relegated to Asia/Oceania Zone Group II in 2018.

Group II 
 Venue: Pamir Stadium, Dushanbe, Tajikistan (outdoor hard)
 Date: 18–23 July

The thirteen teams were divided into three pools of three teams and one pool of four teams. The four pool winners took part in a play-off to determine the nation advancing to Group I in 2018.

Seeding: The seeding was based on the Fed Cup Rankings of 24 April 2017 (shown in parentheses below).

Pools

Play-offs

1st to 4th playoffs

5th to 13th playoffs

Final placements 

  advanced to Asia/Oceania Zone Group I in 2018.

References 

 Fed Cup Result, 2017 Asia/Oceania Group I
 Fed Cup Result, 2017 Asia/Oceania Group II

External links 
 Fed Cup website

 
Asia Oceania
Tennis tournaments in Kazakhstan
Tennis tournaments in Tajikistan